Japan competed at the 2020 Winter Youth Olympics in Lausanne, Switzerland from 9 to 22 January 2020.

Medalists

| width="78%" align="left" valign="top" |

Medalists in mixed NOCs events

Alpine skiing

Boys

Girls

Mixed

Biathlon

Boys

Girls

Mixed

Cross-country skiing

Girls

Curling

Japan qualified a mixed team of four athletes.

Mixed team

Mixed doubles

Figure skating

Two Japanese figure skaters achieved quota places for Japan based on the results of the 2019 World Junior Figure Skating Championships.

Singles

Couples

Mixed NOC team trophy

Freestyle skiing

Slopestyle & Big Air

Ice hockey

Girls' tournament
Summary

Team roster
Yuko Chujo
Yuzuyu Fujii
Nao Fukuda
Komomo Ito
Makoto Ito
Minami Kamada
Kaaya Komoto
Nagomi Murakami
Rio Noro
Riri Noro
Reina Sato
Hina Shimomukai
An Shinoda
Himari Suzuki
Masaki Tanabe
Kyoka Tsutsumi
Harua Umemori

Mixed NOC 3x3 tournament
Boys
Gosei Daikuhara
Issa Otsuka
Wataru Suzuki
Tomoyoshi Yuki

Girls
Sena Hasegawa
Ruka Kiyokawa
Yuna Kusama
Riko Matsumoto
Reina Sato

Luge

Girls

Nordic combined

Individual

Short track speed skating

Three Japanese skaters achieved quota places for Japan based on the results of the 2019 World Junior Short Track Speed Skating Championships.

Boys

Girls

Skeleton

Ski jumping

Boys

Girls

Snowboarding

Snowboard cross

Halfpipe, Slopestyle, & Big Air

Speed skating

Four Japanese skaters achieved quota places for Japan based on the results of the 2019 World Junior Speed Skating Championships.

Boys

Girls

Mass Start

Mixed

See also
Japan at the 2020 Summer Olympics

References

2020 in Japanese sport
Nations at the 2020 Winter Youth Olympics
Japan at the Youth Olympics